Joystone is a studio album collaboration between Jimi Tenor and Kabu Kabu, a group of west-African musicians living in Berlin. Former Fela Kuti bandmate Nicholas Addo Nettey contributed vocals to track twelve.

References
 Joystone @ Sähkö Recordings
 Joystone track-by-track commentary @ Tenorvision

2007 albums
Ubiquity Records albums